Montari Kamaheni (born 1 February 2000) is a Ghanaian footballer who plays as a left-back for Ashdod.

Career
On 12 June 2020, Kamaheni signed for the Israeli Premier League club in Ashdod. After two years on loan, Kamaheni joined Ashdod on a permanent deal in June 2021.

Honours 
Individual

 IFFHS CAF Youth Team of the Year: 2020

References

External links
 
 

2000 births
Living people
Ghanaian footballers
Dreams F.C. (Ghana) players
F.C. Ashdod players
Israeli Premier League players
Expatriate footballers in Israel
Ghanaian expatriate sportspeople in Israel
Ghana youth international footballers
Association football defenders